Parestola zapotensis is a species of beetle in the family Cerambycidae. It was described by Bates in 1880. It is known from Guatemala, Honduras, and Panama.

References

Desmiphorini
Beetles described in 1880